The Bentworth School District is a small, rural public school district located in southwestern Pennsylvania. It covers the boroughs of Bentleyville, Cokeburg, and Ellsworth as well as North Bethlehem Township and Somerset Township in Washington County, Pennsylvania. According to 2000 federal census data, it served a resident population of 8,837. By 2010, Bentworth School District's population declined to 8,555 people. In 2009, the residents' per capita income was $19,204, while the District's median family income was $43,148 a year. In the Commonwealth, the median family income was $49,501 and the United States median family income was $49,445, in 2010. By 2013, the median household income in the United States rose to $52,100.

Schools
The school system's name is a combination of the former public schools operated in Bentleyville (Bears) and Ellsworth (Tigers). The school's mascot, the Bearcat, is also a combination of those belonging to former schools.

Historic schools
Bentleyville Elementary School (Washington Street School, Bentleyville High School)
Somerset Elementary School
Scenery Hill School (presently North Bethlehem Twp. Community Center)
Nicholl School
Ellsworth Schools

Current schools
The system currently operates three schools:

 Bentworth Elementary Center serves students K-4th grade with a student-teacher ratio of 14:1.
 Bentworth Middle School  serves students 5th–8th grade with a student-teacher ratio of 14:1.
 Bentworth High School

The elementary and high schools are located in Bentleyville Borough while the middle school is located nearby in Somerset Township. Additionally, the District maintains an athletic field in Ellsworth.

Extracurriculars
Bentworth School District offers a variety of clubs, activities and interscholastic athletics

Sports
The Bentworth School District funds:

Boys
Baseball – AA
Basketball- AA
Football – AA
Golf – AA
Soccer – A
Track and Field – AA
Wrestling	– AA

Girls
Basketball – AA
Soccer (Fall) – A
Softball – AA
Track and Field – AA
Volleyball – A

Middle School Sports

Boys
Basketball
Football
Soccer
Wrestling	

Girls
Basketball
Cheerleading
Softball 
Volleyball

According to PIAA directory July 2013

Notable alumni

Bentworth High School

 Justine Ezarik (2002), Internet Personality, known for her YouTube channel, IJustine.

Bentleyville High School

 Val Jansante, footballer, Pittsburgh Steeler (1946–51)
 Barry Stout (1960); Pennsylvania state senator

Ellsworth High School

 Donald P. Bellisario (1953); screenwriter and producer

References

Bentworth School District

Education in Pittsburgh area
School districts in Washington County, Pennsylvania